Popławy may refer to the following places:
Popławy, Łódź Voivodeship (central Poland)
Popławy, Chełm County in Lublin Voivodeship (east Poland)
Popławy, Podlaskie Voivodeship (north-east Poland)
Popławy, Łęczna County in Lublin Voivodeship (east Poland)
Popławy, Masovian Voivodeship (east-central Poland)